The Friars qualified for the Hockey East championship game, losing to the top-ranked Northeastern Huskies. Earning an at-large selection for the 2021 NCAA National Collegiate Women's Ice Hockey Tournament, the Friars were ranked as the #7 seed.

Offseason

Recruiting

Regular season

Standings

Schedule
Source:

|-
!colspan=12 style="  "| Regular Season
|-

|-
!colspan=12 style="  "| Hockey East Tournament
|-

|-
!colspan=12 style="  "| NCAA Tournament
|-

Roster

2020–21 Friars

Awards and honors
Sandra Abstreiter, 2020-21 Hockey East Third Team All-Star
Brooke Becker, Hockey East Rookie of the Week (awarded February 1, 2021)
Brooke Becker, Hockey East Rookie of the Month, February 2021
Brooke Becker, Hockey East All-Rookie Team
Lauren DeBlois, 2020-21 Hockey East Third Team All-Star
Sara Hjalmarsson, 2020-21 Hockey East Second Team All-Star
Claire Tyo, Hockey East Rookie of the Month, January 2021
Claire Tyo, Hockey East All-Rookie Team

References

Providence Friars
2020-21 Providence Friars women's ice hockey season